Walnut Inn, also known as the Hanna, Hunter, & Co., Hanna Travis & Co., and Williamson & Travis, was a historic hotel and commercial building located at Tarkio, Atchison County, Missouri. It was built as a store about 1884 and converted to a hotel in 1911.  It was a two-story, rectangular brick building.  The building measured 54 feet wide and extended 100 feet deep.  It featured a wraparound porch.

It was listed on the National Register of Historic Places in 1982. In recent years, the building fell into disrepair until it was torn down starting on May 22, 2017.

References

Hotel buildings on the National Register of Historic Places in Missouri
Commercial buildings completed in 1884
Hotel buildings completed in 1911
Buildings and structures in Atchison County, Missouri
National Register of Historic Places in Atchison County, Missouri
Demolished buildings and structures in Missouri
Buildings and structures demolished in 2017
Demolished hotels in the United States
Defunct hotels in the United States